United International Bank was an overseas Chinese bank in the United States, formerly headquartered in New York City.

The bank established itself as a locally based community bank serving Chinese Americans and Asian Americans in the New York City-area. Most of its clients were newly arrived immigrants and local small business owners who faced difficulties in obtaining financial support from other mainstream banks. In addition to serving the needs of small business owners and entrepreneurs, the bank specialized in financing credit arrangement for import and export trades.

Unlike most overseas Chinese banks in the United States whose managements consist mainly of Chinese people, the managerial team of United International Bank included a  significant number of non-Asians.  These included many experienced former executives of mainstream banks invited to help lead the bank to prosperity.  The advisory committee and board of directors of the bank included a number of celebrities such as the famed Dr. Henry C. Lee, and other community activists and leaders.

The bank was one of the first in providing both traditional and simplified Chinese characters on its ATMs and internet banking website.

In 2015, Preferred Bank acquired UIB for $22.2 million.

References

External links
 UIBBank.com

Banks based in New York City
Banks established in 2006
Chinese American banks
Chinese-American culture in New York City
Privately held companies based in New York City
Banks disestablished in 2015
2015 mergers and acquisitions

zh:國際銀行